The 19th Mississippi Infantry Regiment was an infantry formation in the Confederate States Army during the American Civil War, and was successively commanded by Colonels Christopher Mott, Lucius Lamar, Nathaniel Harris, Thomas Hardin, and Richard Phipps.

History 
The Nineteenth Mississippi was organized on June 1, 1861, in the Mississippi Volunteers from the counties of Noxubee, Lafayette, Warren, Jefferson, Tippah, Marshall, and Itawamba. It fought with the Army of Northern Virginia from Williamsburg to Cold Harbor, then served in the Petersburg trenches south of the James River and the Appomattox Campaign. This regiment lost 15 killed and 85 wounded of the 501 engaged at Williamsburg, had 58 killed, 264 wounded, and three missing at Gaines' Mill and Frayser's Farm, and had six killed and 52 wounded in the Maryland Campaign. Its casualties were six killed and 40 wounded at Chancellorsville and seven percent of the 372 at Gettysburg disabled. On April 9, 1865, it surrendered with eight officers and 129 men.

Regimental order of battle 
Units of the Nineteenth Mississippi included:

 Company A (President Davis Guards)
 Company B (Mott Guards)
 Company C (Warren Rifles)
 Company D (Thomas Hinds Guards)
 Company E (McClung Riflemen)
 Company F (Avant Southrons)
 Company G (Springport Invincibles)
 Company H
 Company I 
 Company K (Jake Thompson Guards)

See also  
 List of Mississippi Civil War Confederate units

Notes

References

Citations

Sources

Further reading 

 
 Davis, Mathew Jack (1934). Reminiscence of the War for Secession and of Fort Delaware. Unpublished manuscript. Briscoe Center for American History.
 
 
 
 

 
1861 establishments in Mississippi
1865 disestablishments in Virginia
Military units and formations established in 1861
Military units and formations disestablished in 1865
Units and formations of the Confederate States Army from Mississippi